Waylen Bay is a small embayment on the west coast of Australia, situated in the Perth suburb of Applecross between Point Dundas to Point Heathcote.

One of the main features of Waylen Bay is a Scout Hall, situated right on the bank. It is home to the Waylen Bay Sea Scout Troop. Waylen Bay is just around the corner from South of Perth Yacht Club.

External links 
 South of Perth Yacht Club
 1st Waylen Bay Sea Scouts
 1st Waylen Bay Venturers

Swan River (Western Australia)
Bays of Western Australia
Applecross, Western Australia